is a Japanese football player. He plays for Zweigen Kanazawa from 2023, on loan from V-Varen Nagasaki.

Career
Koya Okuda joined J3 League club YSCC Yokohama in 2017.

On 7 January 2022, Okuda joined to J2 club, V-Varen Nagasaki.

On 27 December at same year, Okuda was loaned to Zweigen Kanazawa for upcoming 2023 season.

Club statistics
Updated to 2 January 2020.

References

External links
Profile at YSCC Yokohama

1994 births
Living people
Kanagawa University alumni
Association football people from Wakayama Prefecture
Japanese footballers
J2 League players
J3 League players
YSCC Yokohama players
Mito HollyHock players
V-Varen Nagasaki players
Zweigen Kanazawa players
Association football midfielders